In music, Op. 123 stands for Opus number 123. Compositions that are assigned this number include:

 Beethoven – Missa solemnis
 Ries – Piano Concerto No. 6
 Schumann – Festival overture on the Rheinweinlied for orchestra and chorus